The women's 500 m time trial C1–3 track event in cycling at the 2012 Summer Paralympics took place on 1 September at London Velopark.

Results
WR = World Record

References

Women's time trial C1-3
2012 in women's road cycling